Cross-sea traffic ways are vehicle or railroad traffic ways across the sea. Such traffic ways could include bridges or tunnels.

Sea bridges

Existing sea bridges
Anping Bridge (China)
Donghai Bridge (China)
Haicang Bridge (China)
Hangzhou Bay Bridge (China)
Hong Kong–Zhuhai–Macau Bridge (China)
Jiangnanshan Bridge (China)
Jiaozhou Bay Bridge and Jiaozhou Bay Tunnel (China)
Jintang Bridge (China)
Pingtan Strait Road-Rail Bridge (China)
Xiamen Zhangzhou Bridge (China)
Xihoumen Bridge (China)
Zhanjiang Bay Bridge (China)
Zhujiajian Strait Bridge (China)
Oresund Bridge (Denmark-Sweden)
Great Belt Fixed Link (Denmark)
King Fahd Causeway (Saudi Arabia-Bahrain)
Bandra-Worli Sea Link (India)
Pamban Bridge (India)
China Maldives Friendship Bridge (Maldives)
Chesapeake Bay Bridge-Tunnel (United States)
Hampton Roads Bridge-Tunnel (United States)
Monitor-Merrimac Memorial Bridge-Tunnel (United States)
Golden Gate Bridge (United States)
Overseas Highway (United States)
Confederation Bridge (Canada)
Tokyo Bay Aqua-Line (Japan)
Seikan Tunnel (Japan)
Channel Tunnel (United Kingdom-France)
Michael Davitt Bridge (Ireland-Achill Island)
Crimean Bridge (Russian-occupied Ukraine)
Pelješac bridge (Croatia)

Sea bridges under construction
Shenzhen–Zhongshan Bridge (China)
Mumbai Trans Harbour Link (India)

Planned or proposed sea bridges
Bohai Bay Bridge (China)
Gibraltar Bridge (Spain-Morocco)
Strait of Messina Bridge (Italy)
Bridge of the Horns (Djibouti-Yemen)
Bering Strait bridge (Russia-United States)
Sunda Strait Bridge (Indonesia)
British Isles Connectors (Great Britain-Ireland)
Qatar Bahrain Causeway bridge (Qatar-Bahrain)

Sea tunnels

Existing sea tunnels
Dalian Bay Subsea Tunnel (China)
Qingdao Jiaozhou Bay tunnel (China)
Xiamen XiangAn Tunnel (China)
Xiamen-Haicang Undersea Tunnel (China)
Channel Tunnel (France-United Kingdom)
Seikan Tunnel (Japan)

Sea tunnels under construction
The second Jiaozhou Bay Subsea Tunnel (China)
Shantou SuAi Bay Subsea Tunnel (China)
Shenzhen Mawan Cross-Sea Tunnel (China)
Xidian Bay Subsea Tunnel (China)
Fehmarn Belt Fixed Link

Planned or proposed sea tunnels
Bohai Strait tunnel (China)
Qiongzhou Strait Tunnel (China)
Taiwan Strait Tunnel Project (China)

Traffic dams
Väinatamm (Saaremaa-Muhu)

References

 
Transport buildings and structures